Raymond Bernard Evans (February 4, 1915 – February 15, 2007) was an American songwriter. He was a partner in a composing and song-writing duo with Jay Livingston, known for the songs they composed for films. Evans wrote the lyrics and Livingston wrote the music.

Biography
Evans was born to a Jewish family in Salamanca, New York, to Philip and Frances Lipsitz Evans. He was valedictorian of his high school class, where he played clarinet in the band. The Salamanca High School yearbook from 1931 states: "His original themes and brilliant oral talks are the despair of his classmates. Ray's quite a humorist, too. At times, his satire is positively killing." He received a bachelor's degree in Economics from the University of Pennsylvania's Wharton School in 1936, writing a senior thesis on "The relation between the central bank, member banks and the money market."

Evans met Jay Livingston while a student at Penn. Together they played in the University's college dance orchestra, "The Continentals." During school vacations the orchestra was engaged to play on several international cruises. After graduation the duo continued their partnership, seeking a career as a song-writing team in New York and later Hollywood. Their first big break came after auditioning for comedians Ole Olsen and Chic Johnson in 1939. Their song "G'Bye Now" made it into Olsen and Johnson's Broadway revue [[Hellzapoppin (musical)|Hellzapoppin''']]. In 1946 Livingston and Evans signed a contract with Paramount Studios in Hollywood.

Livingston and Evans did not hit the top until 1946, when they set the music publishing business on fire with "To Each His Own," which reached number one on the Billboard charts for three different artists, and occupied the top five positions on the "Most Played On the Air" chart for four different weeks (August 24, 1946, and again on September 7, September 14 and October 5, five versions appeared simultaneously in the Top Ten). "Buttons and Bows" (1947) was their next multi-million seller", written for the movie The Paleface, with four artists reaching the top ten in 1948, and won the Academy Award for Best Song. They finished off the decade with 1949's "Mona Lisa", written for the movie Captain Carey, U.S.A.. It was a chart hit for seven popular and two country artists in 1950, sold a million for Nat King Cole, and won the pair another Best Song Oscar.

Livingston and Evans, both members of ASCAP, won their third Academy Award for the song "Que Sera Sera", featured in the Alfred Hitchcock movie The Man Who Knew Too Much and sung by Doris Day. Another popular song that he and Livingston wrote for a film was the song "Tammy", written for the 1957 movie Tammy and the Bachelor. The song was nominated for an Academy Award for Best Song. Livingston and Evans also wrote popular TV themes for shows including Bonanza and Mr. Ed. Their Christmas song "Silver Bells" intended for the 1951 Bob Hope film The Lemon Drop Kid, has become a Christmas standard.

Evans appeared as himself with Livingston in the film Sunset Boulevard in the New Year's Eve party scene.

In 1958, the song-writing team was nominated for a Tony Award for the musical Oh, Captain!. Evans also collaborated separately with Michael Feinstein, Henry Mancini, Max Steiner, and Victor Young. The song "Dear Heart" from the 1964 film of the same name was written by Livingston and Evans with Henry Mancini; it was nominated for an Oscar and for the Song of the Year Grammy Award, and was recorded multiple times, charting for Andy Williams, Jack Jones, and Henry Mancini.

Legacy and death
Evans is an inductee in the Songwriters Hall of Fame. He and Livingston have a star on the Hollywood Walk of Fame.

He died at age 92 in Los Angeles, California, on the 42nd anniversary of the death of Nat King Cole, who had made "Mona Lisa" so famous. He was married for nearly 56 years to actress, writer, and playwright Wyn Ritchie Evans. His legacy is maintained and developed by the Ray and Wyn Ritchie Evans Foundation in Culver City, California. The Ray Evans Seneca Theater in his hometown of Salamanca, NY is named after him.

Works

Ray Evans wrote more than 700 songs for screen, stage, and television. Most were composed with writing partner Jay Livingston.

Works on Screen

Works on Stage

Works on Television

References

External links

The Ray and Wyn Ritchie Evans Foundation Official Website
Ray Evans papers, 1921-2012, Kislak Center for Special Collections, Rare Books and Manuscripts, University of Pennsylvania.
Obituary, The Guardian, February 20, 2007
Obituary, The Independent, February 20, 2007
 Obituary, The Telegraph, February 20, 2007
Obituary, The New York Times'', February 17, 2007
Ray Evans Interview NAMM Oral History Library (1995)

1915 births
2007 deaths
American musical theatre lyricists
Broadway composers and lyricists
Best Original Song Academy Award-winning songwriters
Jewish American songwriters
Wharton School of the University of Pennsylvania alumni
People from Salamanca, New York
Burials at Westwood Village Memorial Park Cemetery
20th-century American musicians
Songwriters from New York (state)
20th-century American Jews
21st-century American Jews